Sangram Singh I (IAST: Rāṇā Saṅgrāma Siṃha; c. 1482 – 1528 CE), popularly known as Rana Sanga or Maharana Sanga, was an Indian ruler from the Sisodia dynasty. He ruled Mewar, the traditional territory of Guhilas (Sisodias) in present-day north-western India. However, through his capable rule his kingdom turned into one of the greatest powers of Northern India in early sixteenth century. He controlled parts of present-day Rajasthan, Gujarat, Madhya Pradesh and Uttar Pradesh with the capital being Chittor. His reign was admired by several of his contemporaries, including Babur, who described him as the "greatest Indian King" of that time along with Krishnadevaraya of South India. The Mughal historian Al-Badayuni called Sanga the bravest of all Rajputs along with Prithviraj Chauhan. Rana Sanga was the last independent Hindu king of Northern India to control a significant territory before the Mughal Era. In some contemporary texts, he is described as the Hindu Emperor (Hindupati) of Northern India.

In his long military career, Sanga achieved a series of unbroken successes against several neighbouring Muslim kingdoms, most notably the Lodi dynasty of Delhi. He united several Rajput clans for the first time since the Second battle of Tarain and marched against the Timurid ruler Babur. Despite initial success, Sanga suffered a major defeat at Khanwa through the Timurid's use of gunpowder, which was unknown in North India at the time. He was later poisoned by his own nobles. His defeat at Khanwa is seen as a landmark event in the Mughal conquest of Northern India.

Early life and accession

Sanga was born to the Sisodia King Rana Raimal and Queen Ratan Kunwar a (Chahamana (Chauhan) princess). Although contemporary texts of Sisodias does not mention the year of his birth, but provides some of the astrological planetary positions at the time of his birth, calling them auspicious. Based on these positions, assuming certain other planetary positions and on basis of Kumbhalgarh inscription Historian G.H Ojha calculated Sanga's birth year as 1482 CE. Sanga was youngest of the four sons of Raimal, However, due to the circumstances and after a fierce struggle with his brothers Prithviraj and Jagmal, in which he lost one of his eye, he finally succeeded throne of Mewar in 1508.

Military career
After his ascension to the throne, Sanga reunited the warring clans of Rajputana through diplomacy and marital alliances. Babur, the founder of the Mughal Empire, mentions in his memoirs the challenges he faced in India, Babur described Sanga as the greatest infidel(Hindu) king  of India along with Krishnadevaraya of Vijayanagara Empire in South. Babur further said that Sanga had recently grown so great by his audacity and sword that his kingdom included a significant portion of Northern India.

According to legends, Sanga had fought a 100 battles and lost only once. In various struggle he lost his wrist and was crippled in leg.  In his illustrious military career, Sanga defeated Sultans of Delhi, Malwa and Gujarat in 18 pitched battles and expanded his domain by conquering much of Present-day Rajasthan, Madhya Pradesh, Haryana, northern part of Gujarat and parts of Amarkot, Sindh. He re-established Rajput rule in Malwa first time after fall of Paramara kingdom in 1305 CE.

He also removed Jizya tax from the Hindus which was earlier imposed by Muslim rulers. He is considered the last independent Hindu king of Northern India to control a significant territory and in some contemporary texts described as Hindu Emperor.

Conquest of Malwa

Medini Rai a rebellious minister of Malwa sultan was having a life and death struggle for throne of Malwa against Mahmud, he was promised aid by Rana Sanga.
As a result, the combined Sultanate forces of Gujarat and Malwa met the Sisodias led by Sanga at Gagron. The battle resulted in complete route of Sultanate forces and decisive victory of Rajputs.

After the victory in the battle and other skirmishes aftermath Sanga conquered Malwa along with Chanderi. Rai made Chanderi his capital and became king of Malwa. while Silhaditya Tomar establish himself as master of Raisen and Sarangpur region. According to historian Satish Chandra this events took place between 1518 and 1519.

After the victory and restoring Hindu rule in Malwa, Sanga ordered Rai to remove Jizya tax from Hindus of the region.

Wars against Lodhis 

After conquering Malwa, Sanga turned his attention towards northeastern Rajasthan which was then under the control of Khilji's ally, Ibrahim Lodi of Delhi. Ibrahim Lodi, after hearing the news of encroachments by Sanga on his territory, prepared an army and marched against Mewar in 1517. The Rana with his army met Lodi at Khatoli on borders of Hadoti and in the ensuing Battle at Khatoli, Lodi army suffered serious reverses and fled. One Lodi prince was captured and imprisoned. In this battle, Sanga lost an arm by a sword cut, and an arrow made him lame for life.

Lodi, reportedly stunned by this Rajput aggression (the extent of which was unprecedented in the preceding three centuries), once again moved against Mewar in 1518-19 but was humbled again at Battle of Dholpur. Lodi fought Sanga repeatedly, only to be defeated each time, losing his entire land in present-day Rajasthan, while Sanga's influence extended up to the striking distance of Pilia Khar in Agra.

According to a 16th-century text "Parshvanath-Shravan-Sattavisi", Rana Sanga further defeated Ibrahim Lodi at Ranthambore after the Siege of Mandsaur.

Campaign in Gujarat

The battles of Idar were three major battles fought in the principality of Idar between the armies of the two princes of Idar, Bhar Mal who was supported by the Gujarat Sultanate under Muzaffar Shah II and Rai Mal who was supported by the Rajputs under Rana Sanga. The main reason for Sangas involvement in these battles was to reinstate Rai Mal to his rightful throne and to weaken the growing power of the Gujarat Sultanate. In 1517 Rai Mal with the help of Rana Sanga was able to successfully defeat Muzzafar Shah II and retake his kingdom.

In 1520, Sanga invaded Gujarat on the question of the succession of the state of Idar, with his powerful army of 40,000 Rajputs supported by his three vassals. Rao Ganga Rathore of Marwar too joined him with a garrison of 8,000 Rajputs. The other allies of Rana were Rawal Udai Singh of Vagad and Rao Viram deva of Merta. He defeated the Muslim army of Nizam khan and pursued them to Ahmedabad. Sanga called off his invasion 20 miles before the capital Ahmedabad. He plundered the royal treasuries of Gujarat and destroyed several mosques and built temples over them. After a series of victories, Sanga successfully annexed Northern Gujarat and appointed one of his vassals to rule there.

War against  Mughals

On 21 April 1526, the Timurid king Babur invaded India for the fifth time and defeated Ibrahim Lodhi in the First Battle of Panipat and executed him. After the battle, Sanga unified several Rajput clans for the first time since Prithviraj Chauhan, built an army of 100,000 Rajput soldiers and advanced to Agra.

The Mughals captured Bayana fort which was part of Sanga's empire therefore a major clash took place in Bayana in February 1527 in which Mughal forces of Babur led by Abdul Aziz were defeated by Rana Sanga. The defeat of the Mughals was the last of Rana Sanga's victories. Confronting a large Hindu army, now incited religious propaganda against the Rajputs by declaring the battle as a Jihad against the Kaffirs. He further sought divine favor by abjuring liquor, breaking the wine vessels and pouring the wine down a well.

In ensuring battle fought at Khanwa, 37 miles (60 km) west of Agra, on March 16. The Mughals were victorious due to their cannons, matchlocks and other firearms. Sanga was struck by an arrow in mid of the battle and was removed from the battle by his brother-in law Prithviraj Kachwaha of Amber along with prince Maldev Rathore in an unconscious state. Following his victory, Babur ordered a tower of enemy skulls to be erected, a practice formulated by Timur against his adversaries, irrespective of their religious beliefs. According to Chandra, the objective of constructing a tower of skulls was not just to record a great victory, but also to terrorize opponents. Earlier, the same tactic had been used by Babur against the Afghans of Bajaur.

Sanga was also betrayed by Silhadi during the battle who changed sides and went over to Babur.

The victory of Mughals is seen as a landmark event in Mughal conquest of North India as the battle turned out to be more historic and eventful than Panipat because it made Babur the undisputed master of North India while crushing the threatening and reviving Rajput powers. According to historian Andre Wink after the victory at Khanwa, the centre of Mughal power became Agra instead of Kabul and continued to remain so until its downfall after Aalamgir's death. According to modern historians had there not been the cannons of Babur, Sanga might have achieved a historic victory against Babur. Babur's cannons had put an end to the outdated trends in Indian warfare.

However it would be wrong to suppose that the Rajput power was crushed for ever, Babar stopped his further invasion in Rajasthan, the Rajput forces encamped at Baswa near Dausa for Sanga's treatment, soon after treatment, Sanga started preparation of another war against Babar.

Death and succession
Sanga was taken away from the battlefield in an unconscious state by Prithviraj Singh I Kachwaha and Maldeo Rathore of Marwar. After regaining consciousness he took an oath to not return to Chittor until he had defeated Babur and conquered Delhi. He also stopped wearing a Turban and used to wrap a cloth over his head. While he was preparing to wage another war against Babur , he was poisoned by his own nobles who did not want another conflict with Babur. He died in Kalpi in January 1528 or on May 20, 1528 and was succeeded by his son Ratan Singh II.

After Sanga's defeat his vassal Medini Rai was defeated by Babur at Siege of Chanderi and Babur captured the capital of Rai kingdom Chanderi. Medini was offered Shamsabad instead of Chanderi as it was historically important in conquering Malwa but Rao refused the offer and chose to die fighting. The Rajput women and children committed Self-immolation to save their honour from Babur's army. Babur subsequently captured Malwa along with Chanderi following his victory which was earlier ruled by Rai.

In popular culture 
 1988–1989 : Bharat Ek Khoj, broadcast on Doordarshan, where he was played by Ravi Jhankal.
 2013–2015: Bharat Ka Veer Putra – Maharana Pratap, broadcast by Sony Entertainment Television (India), where he was portrayed by Aarav Chowdhary.

References

Bibliography 

 

 
 
 

1482 births
1528 deaths
Mewar dynasty
Rajput rulers
History of Udaipur
Hindu monarchs
16th-century Indian monarchs
1528 in India
History of South Asia